Dragon 1 primarily refers to the first iteration of the SpaceX Dragon, a class of unmanned space capsule from SpaceX

Dragon I, Dragon-1, dragon one, may also refer to:

 Dragon1, a visual enterprise architecture
 deHavilland Dragon I, a model of the biplane de Havilland Dragon
 Dragons I: Fire and Ice (2004 film) animated Mega-Blocks film

See also
 SpaceX COTS Demo Flight 1 (December 2010), the first SpaceX Dragon mission
 How to Train Your Dragon 3D (2010 film) first film in a film series
 Dragon (disambiguation)